Bang Sue Station may refer to:

Bang Sue Grand Station, a new railway station planned as Bangkok's new rail terminal
Bang Sue MRT station, an underground station of the Bangkok MRT below Bang Sue Grand Station
Bang Sue Junction railway station, a railway station in Bangkok which will be replaced by the new terminal